Rogue Trader: How I Brought Down Barings Bank and Shook the Financial World is a book by Nick Leeson, who served four years in prison for fraud after bankrupting the London-based Barings Bank in 1995 by hiding $1.4 billion in debt he accumulated as a derivatives trader in Singapore. The book was released on February 19, 1996, by Little, Brown & Company.

Film
The book was made into a 1999 feature film of the same name. Following an interview with Nick Leeson in prison, Sir David Frost realized the potential for a movie and optioned the rights to Nick's story.

Written and directed by James Dearden, the film stars Ewan McGregor (Nick Leeson) and Anna Friel (Lisa Leeson) and was executive produced by Sir David Frost. Released in June 1999, it premiered in London one month prior to Leeson's release from prison in Singapore. Rogue Trader was released on 25 June 1999 in the UK and the US. It was distributed by Pathé in the UK and Cinemax in the US.

See also

Great Salad Oil Swindle
Ugly Americans: The True Story of the Ivy League Cowboys Who Raided the Asian Markets for Millions
The Wolf of Wall Street
Catching the Wolf of Wall Street

References

External links
Official Website of the author

1996 non-fiction books
Books about traders
Non-fiction books adapted into films
Little, Brown and Company books

ja:マネー・トレーダー 銀行崩壊